Asnoldo Vicente Devonish Romero (June 15, 1932 – January 1, 1997) was a Venezuelan track and field athlete  who won the first Olympic medal for his native country.

At the 1952 Summer Olympics in Helsinki, he finished third in the Men's Triple Jump Final, with a distance of 15 metres and 52 centimetres, behind Adhemar da Silva (Brazil) and Leonid Shcherbakov (Soviet Union).

In 1990, he was awarded the Olympic Order.

References 

1932 births
1997 deaths
Venezuelan male triple jumpers
Olympic athletes of Venezuela
Athletes (track and field) at the 1952 Summer Olympics
Athletes (track and field) at the 1955 Pan American Games
Olympic bronze medalists for Venezuela
Pan American Games silver medalists for Venezuela
Pan American Games medalists in athletics (track and field)
Medalists at the 1952 Summer Olympics
Sportspeople from Maracaibo
Recipients of the Olympic Order
Olympic bronze medalists in athletics (track and field)
Medalists at the 1955 Pan American Games
20th-century Venezuelan people